Graciela Morán (born 18 February 1948) is an Argentine former professional tennis player.

A left-handed player from Cinco Saltos, Morán appeared for the Argentina Federation Cup team in a 1966 tie against West Germany, then in 1967 represented her country at the Pan American Games, held in Winnipeg. She attained Argentina's top national ranking in 1968, winning tournaments including Mar del Plata and Río de la Plata that year.

See also
List of Argentina Fed Cup team representatives

References

External links
 
 
 

1948 births
Living people
Argentine female tennis players
People from Río Negro Province
Tennis players at the 1967 Pan American Games
Pan American Games competitors for Argentina